Born to Be Bad is the seventh studio album by George Thorogood and the Destroyers.  It was released in February 1988 on the EMI label.  The album peaked at #32 on the Billboard 200, and was on the charts for 24 weeks.

Track listing 
 "Shake Your Money Maker" (Elmore James) – 3:29  
 "You Talk Too Much" (George Thorogood) – 4:35  
 "Highway 49" (Big Joe Williams) – 5:46  
 "Born to Be Bad" (Thorogood) – 3:34  
 "You Can't Catch Me" (Chuck Berry) – 3:45  
 "I'm Ready" (Sylvester Bradford, Fats Domino, Al Lewis) – 3:20  
 "Treat Her Right" (Roy Head, Gene Kurtz) – 3:32  
 "I Really Like Girls" (Thorogood) – 3:49  
 "Smokestack Lightning" (Howlin' Wolf) – 3:15  
 "I'm Movin' On" (Hank Snow) – 3:58

Personnel 
The following personnel are credited on the album:

Musicians

 George Thorogood – guitar, vocals
 Billy Blough – bass
 Hank Carter – saxophone, vocals
 Jeff Simon – drums
 Steve Chrismar – guitar

Technical

 Delaware Destroyers – producer
 Terry Manning – producer, engineer, mixing
 Ken Irwin – production assistant
 Bob Ludwig – mastering
 Henry Marquez – art direction
 Moshe Brakha – photography
 John Tobler – liner notes

Charts

Certifications

References 

George Thorogood and the Destroyers albums
1988 albums
Albums produced by Terry Manning
EMI Records albums